Dirk Köhler (18 March 1968 – 30 May 1994) was a German sport shooter who competed in the 1988 Summer Olympics. He was born in Karlsruhe.

References

1968 births
1994 deaths
German male sport shooters
ISSF pistol shooters
Olympic shooters of West Germany
Shooters at the 1988 Summer Olympics
Sportspeople from Karlsruhe
20th-century German people